Time War can refer to:
 Temporal war, a fictional conflict that takes place in multiple time periods, instigated by factions in the future who then travel back and alter history to their own ends
Time War (Doctor Who), an event in the fictional Doctor Who universe
Time War, a module in the Nintendo game Meteos
Time War, a fantasy novel by Lin Carter, published in 1974
Time War (board game), a time travel wargame published in 1979 by Yaquinto

See also
 Temporal Cold War, in the Star Trek universe